

Ælfmaer was a medieval Bishop of Sherborne.

Ælfmaer was consecrated in 1017. He died in 1023, possibly on 5 April.

Citations

References

External links
 

Bishops of Sherborne (ancient)
1023 deaths
11th-century English Roman Catholic bishops
Year of birth unknown